The North Staffordshire Regiment Football Club was the association football team of the 2nd battalion of the North Staffordshire Regiment. While deployed at the Victoria Barracks, Belfast the team played in the Irish Football League for three seasons from 1896 until 1899. A regimental team also won the Munster Senior Cup in 1911–12.

Honours
City of Belfast Charities Competition: 1
1897-98
Irish Army Cup: 1
1897-98
Munster Senior Cup
 1911–12

References

Defunct association football clubs in Northern Ireland
Defunct Irish Football League clubs
Association football clubs in Belfast
Former senior Irish Football League clubs
Association football in the British Army
Military football clubs in Northern Ireland
Defunct association football clubs in Ireland